The following table shows the world record progression in the men's 20 kilometres walk, as recognised by the IAAF. Notice that the records for road walk and track walk are considered separately.

World record progression

References

Athletix

Walk, 20 km men
20 km walk men's world record